Larry Demetric Johnson (born March 14, 1969) is an American former professional basketball player who spent his career as a power forward with the Charlotte Hornets and the New York Knicks of the National Basketball Association (NBA). In 2008, Johnson was inducted into the Southern Nevada Sports Hall of Fame. He was then inducted into the College Basketball Hall of Fame on November 24, 2019.

High school career
In his senior year at Skyline High School in Dallas, Texas, Johnson was a member of the 1987 McDonald's High School All-American Team.

College career

Odessa (1987–1989) 
Johnson originally made a verbal commitment to play for Dave Bliss at Southern Methodist University, but he instead enrolled at Odessa College in Texas following a dispute with the SMU administration about the legitimacy of one his SAT scores. He played the 1987–88 and 1988–89 seasons at Odessa, averaging 22.3 points per game as a freshman and over 29 points per game his sophomore year, becoming the first and, to date, only player ever to win the National Junior College Athletic Association Division 1 Player of the Year award both years played. There were even some basketball analysts who believed Johnson could have been a first round selection in the 1989 NBA draft (even a possible NBA lottery selection) if he had declared for early entry.

UNLV (1989–1991) 
Johnson eventually transferred to the University of Nevada, Las Vegas (UNLV) to play under head coach Jerry Tarkanian.
Alongside future NBA players Stacey Augmon and Greg Anthony, Johnson faced the Duke Blue Devils in the title game of the  1990 NCAA Men's Division I Basketball Tournament. UNLV went on to win the contest by a score of 103–73, with Johnson contributing 22 points and 11 rebounds. The Runnin' Rebels set numerous NCAA records in the tournament, including simultaneous NCAA records for the largest margin of victory and highest score in an NCAA Tournament championship game.

In a post-season mired by charges of recruiting violations and misconduct by UNLV, an agreement was reached between the university and the NCAA to allow for the defense of their title for the 1990–91 season, which would be followed by a suspension from post-season play the following season. Johnson and the Runnin' Rebels responded with a perfect regular season record of 27–0, with an average scoring margin of 26.7 points per game; this total included a 112–105 victory over the Arkansas Razorbacks, ranked second in the country at the time.

In the 1991 NCAA Men's Division I Basketball Tournament, UNLV won the West Regional Tournament only to be upset by eventual champion Duke in the Final Four. Johnson was named a First Team All-American twice, and won the Big West Conference Player of the Year and tournament Most Valuable Player awards in 1990 and 1991. He also won the prestigious John R. Wooden Award and was named Naismith College Player of the Year in 1991. To this day, Johnson is ranked 12th in career scoring and 7th in rebounding at UNLV despite playing only two seasons. He also holds the record for single-season and career field goal percentage. In 2002, Johnson and teammates Augmon and Anthony were inducted into the UNLV Athletic Hall of Fame along with the 1990–91 UNLV men's basketball team.  To date they are the only UNLV team to make back-to-back Final Four appearances.

Professional career

Charlotte Hornets (1991–1996) 
Johnson was selected first overall in the 1991 NBA draft by the Charlotte Hornets, and won the NBA Rookie of the Year Award in his first season. He also competed in the 1992 Slam Dunk Contest at the NBA All-Star Weekend in Orlando, finishing second to Cedric Ceballos of the Phoenix Suns.

In 1993, Johnson was voted to start in that year's All-Star Game, making him the first Hornet in franchise history to receive that honor; he enjoyed his best statistical season with averages of 22.1 points per game and 10.5 rebounds per game in 82 games, which earned him All-NBA Second Team honors. Along with Alonzo Mourning, Muggsy Bogues and Dell Curry, Johnson played with the Hornets at the height of their popularity in the early to mid-1990s. During this time, Johnson, who went by his initialism "LJ" and the nickname "Grandmama" (because of a popular series of commercials for Converse, who signed Johnson to an endorsement contract following his entry into the NBA), was featured on the cover of the premiere issue of SLAM.

In October 1993, Johnson signed what was at the time the most lucrative contract in NBA history, a 12-year, $84 million deal with the Hornets. However, he missed 31 games after spraining his back on December 27, 1993 in a game against the Detroit Pistons. During the summer he played for the U.S. national team (nicknamed Dream Team II) in the 1994 FIBA World Championship, winning the gold medal.

Johnson had entered the league as an explosive power forward, averaging over 20 points and 10 rebounds per game. However, after the injury to his back, Johnson was forced to develop an all-around game with an improved outside shot. In the 1994–95 season, he made 81 three-pointers, nearly 60 more than in his first three years combined, and was selected to the 1995 NBA All-Star Game.

Friction between Johnson and Mourning forced the organization to make a change, and the resulting moves made by the Hornets left both players on other teams. Prior to the 1995–96 season, Mourning was traded to the Miami Heat for Glen Rice and Matt Geiger. Following that season, Johnson was dealt to the New York Knicks for Anthony Mason and Brad Lohaus.

New York Knicks (1996–2001) 
Johnson averaged 12.8 points, a career-low, in his first season as a Knick, and although he would never return to his former All-Star form, he was a key member of the Knicks' 1999 Eastern Conference championship team.

During Game 3 of the Eastern Conference Finals, he was involved in a critical play in which he was fouled by Antonio Davis of the Indiana Pacers. Standing outside the three-point line with 11.9 seconds left, Johnson held the ball, and then began to dribble. He leaned into defender Davis before jumping up. The referee called the foul about a half-second before Johnson released the ball, but it was counted as a continuation shooting foul. Johnson made the shot and converted the free throw following the basket for a four-point play, which turned out to be the winning margin in a 92-91 Knicks victory.

During the 1999 NBA Finals, Johnson characterized the Knicks as a band of "rebellious slaves". Bill Walton later called Johnson and his performance a "disgrace". When Johnson was asked about the play of San Antonio Spurs point guard Avery Johnson in Game 4, Johnson again shifted the topic to slavery: "Ave, man, we're from the same plantation. You tell Bill Walton that. We from Massa Johnson's plantation." He went on to say, "Here's the NBA, full of blacks, great opportunities, they made beautiful strides. But what's the sense of that ... when I go back to my neighborhood and see the same thing? I'm the only one who came out of my neighborhood. Everybody ended up dead, in jail, on drugs, selling drugs. So I'm supposed to be honored and happy or whatever by my success. Yes, I am. But I can't deny the fact of what has happened to us over years and years and years and we're still at the bottom of the totem pole."

On October 10, 2001, Johnson announced his early retirement from basketball due to chronic back problems that had plagued him for several years, after his point production had decreased for three straight years.

Post-playing career
In July 2007, Johnson expressed interest in making a comeback with the Knicks in some type of "leadership role".
On December 21, 2007, Johnson received a bachelor of arts degree in social science studies from UNLV.  In 2008, Johnson was inducted into the Southern Nevada Sports Hall of Fame. He was hired by the Knicks as a basketball and business operations representative on April 8, 2012.In 2014, he was inducted into the Texas Sports Hall of Fame.

Personal life
Johnson converted to Islam. During the NBA season, he observed Ramadan, the holy month of fasting.

Johnson has five children with four women. In 2015, he filed for bankruptcy in a California court, claiming he owed more than $120,000 in unpaid child support.

Film and television
In 1993, Johnson appeared in the episode "Grandmama" of the sitcom Family Matters as his alter ego "Grandmama", who becomes Steve Urkel's teammate in a basketball tournament.  Later that year, he was a guest on the Late Show with David Letterman. Three years later he appeared as himself in the movies Eddie and Space Jam; in the latter he had a supporting role as a fictionalized version of himself. He was one of the NBA stars who had their basketball abilities stolen alongside Muggsy Bogues, Shawn Bradley, Charles Barkley and Patrick Ewing.

NBA career statistics

Regular season

|-
| style="text-align:left;"| 1991–92
| style="text-align:left;"| Charlotte
| 82 || 77 || 37.2 || .490 || .227 || .829 || 11.0 || 3.6 || 1.0 || .6 || 19.2
|-
| style="text-align:left;"| 1992–93
| style="text-align:left;"| Charlotte
| 82 || 82 || 40.5 || .526 || .254 || .767 || 10.5 || 4.3 || .6 || .3 || 22.1
|-
| style="text-align:left;"| 1993–94
| style="text-align:left;"| Charlotte
| 51 || 51 || 34.5 || .515 || .238 || .695 || 8.8 || 3.6 || .6 || .3 || 16.4
|-
| style="text-align:left;"| 1994–95
| style="text-align:left;"| Charlotte
| 81 || 81 || 39.9 || .480 || .386 || .774 || 7.2 || 4.6 || 1.0 || .3 || 18.8
|-
| style="text-align:left;"| 1995–96
| style="text-align:left;"| Charlotte
| 81 || 81 || 40.4 || .476 || .366 || .757 || 8.4 || 4.4 || .7 || .5 || 20.5
|-
| style="text-align:left;"| 1996–97
| style="text-align:left;"| New York
| 76 || 76 || 34.4 || .512 || .324 || .693 || 5.2 || 2.3 || .8 || .5 || 12.8
|-
| style="text-align:left;"| 1997–98
| style="text-align:left;"| New York
| 70 || 70 || 34.5 || .485 || .238 || .756 || 5.7 || 2.1 || .6 || .2 || 15.5
|-
| style="text-align:left;"| 1998–99
| style="text-align:left;"| New York
| 49 || 48 || 33.4 || .459 || .359 || .817 || 5.8 || 2.4 || .7 || .2 || 12.0
|-
| style="text-align:left;"| 1999–00
| style="text-align:left;"| New York
| 70 || 68 || 32.6 || .433 || .333 || .766 || 5.4 || 2.5 || .6 || .1 || 10.7
|-
| style="text-align:left;"| 2000–01
| style="text-align:left;"| New York
| 65 || 65 || 32.4 || .411 || .313 || .797 || 5.6 || 2.0 || .6 || .4 || 9.9
|- class="sortbottom"
| style="text-align:center;" colspan="2"| Career
| 707 || 699 || 36.3 || .484 || .332 || .766 || 7.5 || 3.3 || .7 || .4 || 16.2
|- class="sortbottom"
| style="text-align:center;" colspan="2"| All-Star
| 2 || 1 || 18.0 || .444 || 1.000 || 1.000 || 4.0 || 1.0 || .0 || .0 || 5.5

Playoffs

|-
| style="text-align:left;"| 1993
| style="text-align:left;"| Charlotte
| 9 || 9 || 38.7 || .557 || .250 || .788 || 6.9 || 3.3 || .6 || .2 || 19.8
|-
| style="text-align:left;"| 1995
| style="text-align:left;"| Charlotte
| 4 || 4 || 43.0 || .477 || .111 || .800 || 5.8 || 2.8 || 1.0 || .5 || 20.8
|-
| style="text-align:left;"| 1997
| style="text-align:left;"| New York
| 9 || 9 || 32.8 || .558 || .353 || .842 || 4.0 || 2.6 || .8 || .1 || 13.8
|-
| style="text-align:left;"| 1998
| style="text-align:left;"| New York
| 8 || 8 || 38.8 || .486 || .200 || .740 || 6.6 || 1.6 || 1.3 || .4 || 17.9
|-
| style="text-align:left;"| 1999
| style="text-align:left;"| New York
| 20 || 20 || 34.2 || .426 || .293 || .674 || 4.9 || 1.6 || 1.1 || .1 || 11.5
|-
| style="text-align:left;"| 2000
| style="text-align:left;"| New York
| 16 || 16 || 36.8 || .461 || .394 || .794 || 5.0 || 1.6 || .5 || .1 || 11.3
|- class="sortbottom"
| style="text-align:center;" colspan="2"| Career
| 66 || 66 || 36.3 || .483 || .303 || .767 || 5.3 || 2.0 || .8 || .2 || 14.2

See also
 1998–99 New York Knicks season
 List of National Basketball Association annual minutes leaders

References

External links

 
 
 

1969 births
Living people
African-American basketball players
African-American Muslims
All-American college men's basketball players
American men's basketball players
Basketball players from Dallas
Charlotte Hornets draft picks
Charlotte Hornets players
Converts to Islam
FIBA World Championship-winning players
Odessa Wranglers men's basketball players
McDonald's High School All-Americans
National Basketball Association All-Stars
New York Knicks players
Parade High School All-Americans (boys' basketball)
Power forwards (basketball)
Small forwards
Sportspeople from Tyler, Texas
United States men's national basketball team players
Universiade gold medalists for the United States
Universiade medalists in basketball
UNLV Runnin' Rebels basketball players
1994 FIBA World Championship players
Medalists at the 1989 Summer Universiade
21st-century African-American people
20th-century African-American sportspeople